Tadashi Takeda (born 27 July 1986) is a Japanese professional football player who plays as a defender for FC Gifu in J3 League. He primarily plays defensive midfielder.

Personal life
Born in Malaysia to Japanese parents, Takeda returned to Japan with his parents at the age of two, and was raised in the Greater Tokyo Area. He first attended Yasumatsu Elementary School in Tokorozawa, Saitama. After his graduation, he attended  in Chiba, and entered the JEF United Chiba youth system in 1999. As of 2020, he had one daughter and one son.

Club career
Takeda signed a professional contract in 2005. In July 2008, he transferred to Fagiano Okayama.

Club statistics
Updated to end of 2018 season.

References

External links
Profile at FC Gifu

 
 Tadashi Takeda's profile

1986 births
Living people
People from Penang
Japanese footballers
J1 League players
J2 League players
J3 League players
Japan Football League players
JEF United Chiba players
Fagiano Okayama players
FC Gifu players
Japanese expatriates in Malaysia
Association football defenders
Citizens of Japan through descent
Keio University alumni